Kiyevskaya, named for the nearby Kiyevsky railway station, is a station on the Arbatsko–Pokrovskaya line of the Moscow Metro. Opened in 1953, it is lavishly decorated in the quasi-baroque style that predominated in the early 1950s. The square pylons are faced with white Ural marble and elaborately patterned ceramic tile and the plastered ceiling is decorated with a series of frescoes by various artists depicting life in Ukraine. A large mosaic at the end of the platform commemorates the 300th anniversary of the reunification of Russia and Ukraine. Light comes from a row of hexagonal chandeliers. The architects were L. V. Lile, V. A. Litvinov, M. F. Markovsky, and V. M. Dobrokovsky.

Kiyevskaya has no vestibule of its own. Instead, escalators at the end of the hall lead to Kiyevskaya and thence to that station's entrance, which is built into the Kiyevsky railway station.

For half a century Kiyevskaya was the terminus of the Arbatsko–Pokrovskaya line; the 2003 extension to Park Pobedy ended that situation.

Transfers
From this station it is possible to transfer to Kiyevskaya on the Filyovskaya line and the Kiyevskaya on the Ring.

Image gallery

References

External links
metro.ru
mymetro.ru
KartaMetro.info – Station location and exits on Moscow map (English/Russian)

Moscow Metro stations
Railway stations in Russia opened in 1953
Arbatsko-Pokrovskaya Line
Railway stations located underground in Russia